Lloyd Landing (also Lloyd, Lloyds, Lloyds Landing) is an unincorporated community in Talbot County, Maryland, United States.

Notes

Unincorporated communities in Talbot County, Maryland
Unincorporated communities in Maryland